The Atabapo Municipality is one of the seven municipalities (municipios) that makes up the southern Venezuelan state of Amazonas and, according to the 2011 census by the National Institute of Statistics of Venezuela, the municipality has a population of 9,169. The town of San Fernando de Atabapo is the municipal seat of the Atabapo Municipality.

Demographics
The Atabapo Municipality, according to a 2007 population estimate by the National Institute of Statistics of Venezuela, has a population of 10,625 (up from 8,475 in 2000). This amounts to 7.4% of the state's population.

Government
The mayor of the Atabapo Municipality is Nelsón Cayupare, elected on October 31, 2004, with 38% of the vote. He replaced Nepomuceno Patiño shortly after the elections. The municipality is divided into three parishes; Ucata, Yapacana, and Caname (previous to December 18, 1997, the Atabapo Municipality contained only a single parish).

References

External links
atabapo-amazonas.gob.ve  

Municipalities of Amazonas (Venezuelan state)